Alejandro "Àlex" Pascual Julià (born 21 May 1977) is a Spanish footballer who plays for CD Eldense in Tercera División, as an attacking midfielder or right winger.

Football career
Born in Muro de Alcoy, Province of Alicante, Pascual spent his entire career in the Valencian Community, starting with CD Alcoyano and Ontinyent CF, playing three of four seasons in Segunda División B. In the 1998 winter transfer window, he joined Hércules CF in Segunda División, appearing in 20 games in his first year and being relegated in his second.

From there onwards, Pascual resumed his career in the lower leagues, notably spending six seasons with former club Ontinyent in Tercera División. In the 2009 summer, aged 32, he signed for a second spell with local Muro Club de Fútbol, also in that level.

In late December 2012 Pascual signed for CD Eldense, still in the fourth category.

References

External links
 
 Futbolme profile

1977 births
Living people
People from Comtat
Sportspeople from the Province of Alicante
Spanish footballers
Footballers from the Valencian Community
Association football wingers
Segunda División players
Segunda División B players
Tercera División players
CD Alcoyano footballers
Ontinyent CF players
Hércules CF players
Valencia CF Mestalla footballers
CD Olímpic de Xàtiva footballers
CD Eldense footballers